The 1928 Paris–Tours was the 23rd edition of the Paris–Tours cycle race and was held on 22 April 1928. The race started in Paris and finished in Tours. The race was won by Denis Verschueren.

General classification

References

1928 in French sport
1928
April 1928 sports events